Weaving Tides is a puzzle adventure video game developed by the Austrian developer Follow the Feathers. It was released on Windows, MacOS and Nintendo Switch on May 27, 2021.

Gameplay 
In Weaving Tides, players take control of a character who rides a dragon. The dragon's tail allows the player to do things like pulling an object, or connecting different parts of the world together. The focus of the game is using these weaving mechanics to interact with the world and solve puzzles. Combat is focused around using the dragons tail and diving beneath the world to stun and defeat enemies. There also are dungeons where the player makes their way through, completing puzzles and fighting enemies and eventually fighting a boss.

Development 
The game started development in 2017, after the developers' previous game NIVA, was completed in 2016. The project was funded with 150.000€ by the Vienna Business Agency in 2018. The developers say the game is inspired by games like Bastion, Tearaway and The Legend of Zelda series. On April 30, 2020 a Kickstarter campaign was created, which gathered 301% of its funding goal, resulting in 54.182 €, and a temporarily available free demo was released alongside it. The game was featured in the 2020 Wholesome Direct indie game showcase. The game was originally set to launch in Q4 2020, but was delayed into 2021 due to the COVID-19 pandemic. Weaving Tides was featured in Nintendo's Indie World Showcase in April 2021.

Reception 
Weaving Tides was released on Steam (PC, Mac) and on Nintendo Switch on May 27, 2021. It received the rating "Strong" on Opencritic.

Awards and recognition 
During the development as well as post-release Weaving Tides was honored with various awards and nominations and was selected for several renowned showcases, including:

 Official Selection EGX Rezzed, Leftfield Collection - London, UK - 2018
 Winner ReVersed, PC Indie Pitch - Vienna, Austria - 2018
 Finalist Best International Indie Game Poznan Game Arena - Poznań, Poland - 2018
 Finalist Best Art Game Access Conference - Brno, Czech Republic - 2019
 Finalist Innovation BIG Festival - São Paulo, Brazil - 2019
 Official Selection Indie Arena Booth @ Gamescom - Cologne, Germany - 2019
 Official Selection FM4 Indie Area @ Game City - Vienna, Austria - 2019
 Best Adventure DreamHack Winter - Jönköping, Sweden - 2019
 2nd Place (Pro Category) Game Development World Championship - online - 2019
 Official Selection Digital Dragons - online - 2020
 Finalist Excellence in Visual Art DevGamm - online - 2020
 Official Selection Indie Arena Booth @ Gamescom - online - 2020
 Finalist Innovation Ludicious - online - 2020
 Winner SAGA Awards - online - 2020
 Finalist Crowd-Funding Campaign of 2020 gamesindustry.biz Indie Publishing Awards - online - 2021
 Finalist Innovation Taipei Game Show - online - 2021
 Finalist Excellence in Visual Art DevGamm - online - 2021
 Finalist Best Game Design (Winner TBA) Develop:Star Awards - Brighton, UK / online - 2021

References

External links 
 Official website

2021 video games
Adventure games
MacOS games
Puzzle video games
Video games about dragons
Windows games
Nintendo Switch games
Video games developed in Austria
Kickstarter-funded video games
Single-player video games